is a railway station in Kashiwara, Osaka Prefecture, Japan.

Lines
West Japan Railway Company
Yamatoji Line

History 
Station numbering was introduced in March 2018 with Kawachi-Katakami being assigned station number JR-Q29.

Adjacent stations

References 

Railway stations in Osaka Prefecture
Railway stations in Japan opened in 1927